The Duke Energy Convention Center is a convention center located in downtown Cincinnati, Ohio, United States, covering two city blocks bounded by Elm Street, 5th Street, 6th Street, and Central Avenue.

History
The convention center opened in 1967 as the Convention-Exposition Center. It was renamed the Albert B. Sabin Convention and Exposition Center on November 14, 1985, amid national criticism that Second Street had been named after Pete Rose instead of the pioneering medical researcher. The convention was renovated and expanded in 2006. In 2020, the center was designed for use as a field hospital along with other similar facilities nationwide to house patients during the COVID-19 pandemic in the event that area hospitals reach capacity.

Operations
Venue management company, OVG360, oversees day-to-day operations of the  facility.

Annual events
RedsFest
Cincinnati Winter Beer Fest
Cincinnati Auto Expo
Cincinnati Home and Garden Show

Notable events
The Duke Energy Center played host to the 2012 World Choir Games when it hosted the opening and closing ceremonies, as well as the awards ceremonies of the games.

In July 2015, the convention center hosted the 2015 MLB All-Star Fan Fest.

The DECC was host to the 1977 National Rifle Association (NRA) annual convention, at which the Revolt at Cincinnati resulted in the election of Harlon Carter as the leader of the NRA, and a change in emphasis for the organization, away from hunting, conservation, and marksmanship and toward an uncompromising defense of the personal ownership of firearms for self-defense.

See also
List of convention centers in the United States

References

External links 

 

Convention centers in Ohio
Buildings and structures in Cincinnati
Event venues established in 1968
Tourist attractions in Cincinnati
World Choir Games venue
1968 establishments in Ohio